The 2013 Speedway Grand Prix of Great Britain, also known as the 2013 FIM Fogo British Speedway Grand Prix for sponsorship reasons, was the fifth race of the 2013 Speedway Grand Prix season. It took place on 1 June at the Millennium Stadium in Cardiff, Wales, United Kingdom. The Grand Prix was won by Emil Sayfutdinov who beat Niels Kristian Iversen, Krzysztof Kasprzak and Fredrik Lindgren in the final.

Riders 
The Speedway Grand Prix Commission nominated Chris Harris as Wild Card, and Craig Cook and Josh Auty both as Track Reserves.

Heat details

The intermediate classification

References

See also 
 motorcycle speedway

Great Britain
Speedway Grand Prix of Great Britain
Speedway Grand Prix of Great Britain
Speedway Grand Prix of Great Britain
Speedway Grand Prix of Great Britain